Themes of transformations are found in all types of mythologies and folklore. Greek mythology features a wide collection of myths where the subjects are physically transformed, usually through either divine intervention or sorcery and spells. Stories of shapeshifting within Greek context are old, having been part of the mythological corpus as far back as the Iliad of Homer. Usually those legends include mortals being changed as punishment from a god, or as a reward for their good deeds. In other tales, gods take different forms in order to test or deceive some mortal. There is a wide variety of type of transformations; from human to animal, from animal to human, from human to plant, from inanimate object to human, from one sex to another, from human to the stars (constellations).

Myths were used to justify or explain or legitimate a precedent, traditions, codes of behaviours and laws. Ancient Greek taboos and prohibitions could also find a place in mythological narrative, as some provided cautionary tales in the form of a fable. Myths about nature, and the transformation into it, attempted to provide a coherent history and tell the origins of the world, the nature, animals, humans and the gods themselves. Accordingly, there has always been efforts to explain the very supernatural elements of those myths in turn, even within Ancient Greece itself, such as the cases of Palaephatus and Heraclitus, who tried to rationalise those myths as misunderstandings.

The fullest surviving and most famous ancient work about transformation in Greek myth is Roman poet Ovid's epic the Metamorphoses. Throughout history, the Metamorphoses has been used not only as a compendium of information on Ancient Greek and Roman lore, but also as a vehicle for allegorical exposition, exegesis, commentaries and adaptations. True enough, in the medieval West, Ovid's work was the principal conduit of Greek myths.

Although Ovid's collection is the most known, there are three examples of Metamorphoses by later Hellenistic writers that preceded Ovid's book, but little is known of their contents. The Heteroioumena by Nicander of Colophon is better known, and had a clear an influence on the poem. However, in a way that was typical for writers of the period, Ovid diverged significantly from his models. Nicander's work consisted of probably four or five books) and positioned itself within a historical framework. Other works include Boios's Ornithogonia (which included tales of humans becoming birds) and little-known Antoninus Liberalis's own Metamorphoses, which drew heavily from Nicander and Boios.

Below is a list of permanent and involuntary transformations featured in Greek and Roman mythological corpus.

List

Metamorphoses into plants

Metamorphoses into animals (non-avian)

Metamorphoses into birds

Metamorphoses into landscape

Metamorphoses into humanoid lifeforms

Metamorphoses into inanimate objects

Metamorphoses into the opposite sex

Changes in base physical appearance

Mischellaneous

Voluntary transformations

Falsely claimed as Greek mythology 
Throughout the eons, several made up and unattested stories involving Greek mythological characters and Greek mythological motives have been passed as genuine Greek myths and beliefs and attributed to various ancient Greek and Roman writers, despite having no basis in Greek mythology and being attested in no ancient Greek or Latin texts. Those do not correspond to ancient beliefs and their origins can be traced in post-antiquity and modern times.

Notes

Bibliography

External links 

 METAMORPHOSES on Greek Mythology Link
 PLANTS OF GREEK MYTH 1 AND 2 from the Theoi Project
 SUMMARY OF TRANSFORMATIONS on A Dictionary of Classical Mythology

Characters in Greek mythology
Greek mythology-related lists
 
Deeds of Zeus
Deeds of Apollo
Deeds of Artemis
Deeds of Ares
Deeds of Athena
Deeds of Poseidon
Deeds of Hermes
Deeds of Gaia
Deeds of Hera
Shapeshifting
Dionysus in mythology
Deeds of Aphrodite
Helios in mythology
Deeds of Demeter
Mythology of Heracles
Deeds of Pan (god)
Deeds of Eros